Carlisle United Football Club is an English football club based in Carlisle, Cumbria, where they play at Brunton Park. Formed in 1904, the club currently compete in League Two, the fourth tier of the English football league system.

History

League
The club was formed on 17 May 1904 at Shaddongate United's annual general meeting where the club's members voted to change the team's name to Carlisle United. The newly formed club initially played at Milhome Bank and later at Devonshire Park, finally settling at their current home Brunton Park in 1909.

In 1905, Carlisle United joined the Lancashire Combination but were only admitted after agreeing to pay all visiting teams’ travel expenses for two years, due to Carlisle not being located in Lancashire. After the league reorganised four years later the board at United decided it did not suit the club's best interests to be there any longer and the club entered the North Eastern League in place of their reserve team who had previously played in the league and been a founding member. When the Carlisle United first team left to join the Football League the reserve team resumed its place in the competition. Carlisle United were crowned champions of the North Eastern League in 1922.

The 1927–28 season was Carlisle's last in the North Eastern League. The close season meant the usual round of applications to join (and be re-elected to) the Football League. Carlisle received the second-most votes with 33, and replaced Durham City, who had received just 11 votes, as members of the Football League.

Carlisle were members of the Third Division North until 1958 when it combined with the Third Division South to become the Fourth Division. They remained there until 1962 when they won their first promotion, they were relegated the following season but immediately bounced back to begin the most prosperous period in the club's history.

Upon gaining promotion to the Third Division in 1964 United immediately won the Third Division Championship the following year. Over twelve years the club cemented themselves as a solid Second Division (Then 2nd Tier in English football) side. Within that period Carlisle finished 7 out of 11 seasons in the top half of the table including 3rd in 66/67, 4th in 70/71 and a 3rd in 73/74 which saw them promoted to the top tier of English football.

Carlisle won their first three fixtures in the First Division to go top of the English football pyramid. The success was short lived however, they finished the season in bottom place and were relegated. Highlight victories include doing a double over Everton, and home victories over eventual champions Derby County, and former title holders Ipswich Town, Arsenal, Burnley, Tottenham Hotspur and Wolverhampton Wanderers.

Carlisle ended their most prosperous period as rapidly as it had started. Back to back relegations in 1986 and 1987 saw them enter the Fourth Division for the first time in 21 years. Their first season in there saw them finish second from bottom but 19 points ahead of relegated Newport County. The lull in league performance continued. A promotion push in 1990 was thwarted by a last match defeat to Maidstone United.

Some good then came of a new owner in the form of Michael Knighton whose financial input helped the club steer clear of relegation in 92/93 gain two promotions in 95, 97 to the second division (now 3rd tier) and gain success in the Football League Trophy. Unfortunately the promotions were immediately followed by relegations in 96 and 98 respectively.

In the 1998–99 season Carlisle found themselves in their second successive relegation battle and needing to gain three points from the final game of the season at home to Plymouth Argyle. At 90 minutes the crowd at Scarborough (Carlisle's relegation rival) were already celebrating before the fourth official stated four minutes of extra time would be played at Brunton Park. In the last kick of the game goalkeeper Jimmy Glass, who had signed in an emergency loan deal from Swindon Town after the transfer deadline, scored from a corner kick which he came up to in a last gasp effort to win the match.

In the following years Carlisle continued to narrowly avoid relegation one season after the other. From the 97/98 season through to 03/04 the club only once finished above 22nd in the English fourth tier. The bullet dodging did eventually cease however when in 2004 they lost Football league status for the first time since 1928, becoming the first former top flight club to fall into the fifth tier.

Carlisle were promoted out of the non-league at the first time of asking in 2005, winning the play-off final at the Britannia Stadium, Stoke. Carlisle's excellent form under manager Paul Simpson continued into the following season as they returned to the Football League with a bang, clinching the League Two title. Simpson then departed for Preston North End, and was succeeded by Neil McDonald. The following few seasons saw Carlisle achieve their highest league finishes for 22 years and the highest average crowds for 30 years. This coincided with several seasons at the top half of League One including a playoff finish in 2008.

Football League Trophy
Since its inception Carlisle have competed in almost every season of the Football League Trophy, including in 2004–05 when they did not hold Football League status. In total they have reached the final six times, more than any other team. The club first won the competition in 1997, beating Colchester United. The game, which took place at Wembley Stadium, was drawn 0–0 in 90 minutes and continued to a penalty shoot-out. Thanks to Tony Caig's heroics in goal Carlisle won the shoot-out 4–3. The second win came in 2011, a year after suffering a 4–1 defeat to Southampton in the previous final. This time Carlisle were able to defeat Brentford by a single goal.

Key

Key to league record
 Level = Level of the league in the current league system
 Pld = Games played
 W = Games won
 D = Games drawn
 L = Games lost
 GF = Goals for
 GA = Goals against
 GD = Goals difference
 Pts = Points
 Position = Position in the final league table
 Top scorer and number of goals scored shown in bold when he was also top scorer for the division. Number of goals includes goals scored in play-offs.

Key to cup records
 Res = Final reached round
 Rec = Final club record in the form of wins-draws-losses
 PR = Preliminary round
 QR1 (2, etc.) = Qualifying Cup rounds
 G = Group stage
 R1 (2, etc.) = Proper Cup rounds
 QF = Quarter-finalists
 SF = Semi-finalists
 F = Finalists
 A (QF, SF, F) = Area quarter-, semi-, finalists
 W = Winners

Seasons

References

English football club seasons